Maria do Céu Guerra (born 26 May 1943) is a Portuguese actress. She appeared in more than fifty films since 1964.

Selected filmography

References

External links 

1943 births
Living people
Portuguese film actresses
Sophia Award winners